Karate, for the 2013 World Combat Games, was held at the Spartak - Sports Complex 'Arena', in Saint Petersburg, Russia. Competition took place on the 20 and 21 October 2013.

Medal table

Medal summary

Men

Women

References

World Combat Games
2013 World Combat Games events
2013 in karate